DXMB may refer to:
 DXMB-AM, an AM radio station broadcasting in Malaybalay
 DXMB-FM, an FM radio station broadcasting in Butuan, branded as Love Radio